John Winger from California is a retired NASCAR Grand National driver whose career involved three races of the 1968 season (1968 Islip 300, 1968 Maine 300, and the 1968 Fonda 200). Winger raced for 381 laps; starting in an average of 13th and finishing in an average of 19th. He managed to race  in his one-year career.

References

NASCAR drivers
Racing drivers from California
Living people
Year of birth missing (living people)